Iakora is a town in the southern hills of Ihorombe Region in central Madagascar. It is approximately 45 kilometres from Betroka.

It is situated on the river with the same name: Iakora river. In 2021 a military base was inaugurated in this municipality.

References

Populated places in Ihorombe